Changmu (Mandarin: 常牧镇) is a town in Guide County, Hainan Tibetan Autonomous Prefecture, Qinghai, China. In 2010, Changmu had a total population of 16,703 people: 8,324 males and 8,379 females: 4,433 under 14 years old, 11,266 aged between 15 and 64 and 1,044 over 65 years old.

References 

Township-level divisions of Qinghai
Guide County